The Sri Lankan national cricket team toured New Zealand January to March 1991 and played a three-match Test series against the New Zealand national cricket team. The series was drawn 0–0. New Zealand were captained by Martin Crowe and Sri Lanka by Arjuna Ranatunga. In addition, the teams played a three-match series of Limited Overs Internationals (LOI) which New Zealand won 3–0.

Test series summary

1st Test

2nd Test

3rd Test

One Day Internationals (ODIs)

New Zealand won the Bank of New Zealand Trophy 3-0.

1st ODI

2nd ODI

3rd ODI

References

External links

1991 in Sri Lankan cricket
1991 in New Zealand cricket
International cricket competitions from 1988–89 to 1991
New Zealand cricket seasons from 1970–71 to 1999–2000
1991